Asura modesta is a moth of the family Erebidae. It is found in China.

References

modesta
Moths described in 1899
Moths of Asia